The Montreal Quebecois was a team part of the original National Lacrosse League. They played their home games at the Montreal Forum. The roster included Major League Soccer coach Bruce Arena.

Qu
1974 establishments in Quebec
1975 disestablishments in Quebec
Lacrosse clubs established in 1974
Lacrosse clubs disestablished in 1975